Vallentinia is a genus of hydrozoans in the family Olindiidae.

Species 
The World Register of Marine Species currently lists the following species:
 Vallentinia adherens Hyman, 1947
 Vallentinia falklandica Browne, 1902
 Vallentinia gabriellae Vannucci Mendes, 1948

References 

Olindiidae
Hydrozoan genera